Rochester Common was a station on the Chatham Extension from Strood serving the town of Rochester.

The station was opened by the South Eastern Railway which merged with the London, Chatham and Dover Railway to form the South Eastern and Chatham Railway in 1899. After the merger the SE & CR deemed that the Chatham Extension was an unnecessary duplication of the line and stations that it inherited from the LC & DR, and therefore the Extension and its stations, including Rochester Central (as it was then named), was closed in 1911. The station was demolished soon after closure and the site of the station later became sidings for Rochester Freight Depot until .. Since closure the whole area has been redeveloped erasing any trace of the railway.

The track layout was remodelled so that only the South Eastern Railway's bridge over the River Medway was used, and that layout is still there in the present day Chatham Main Line route.

The London, Chatham and Dover Railway's bridge lay unused and then derelict until it was rebuilt in the 1960s to be the eastbound carriageway for a widened A2 road bridge which opened in 1970.

References

Disused railway stations in Kent
Former South Eastern Railway (UK) stations
Railway stations in Great Britain opened in 1891
Railway stations in Great Britain closed in 1911